is a Japanese voice actress from Fukuoka Prefecture.

Filmography

Anime television series

2012
Campione! as Hikari Mariya
Haiyore! Nyaruko-san as Female Student (episode 10)
JoJo's Bizarre Adventure as Customer B (episode 10)

2013
Day Break Illusion as Female Student (episode 4)
Dog & Scissors as Hami Oosawa
Genshiken: Second Generation as Kenjiro Hata (Female)
Stella Women's Academy, High School Division Class C3 as Akane & Moe Seto
Sunday Without God as Memepo Gedenburg, Mimiita Gedenburg

2014
Aikatsu! as Noel Otoshiro
Aldnoah.Zero as Nina Klein
Amagi Brilliant Park as Isuzu Sento
Bladedance of Elementalers as Terminus Est
Daimidaler the Sound Robot as Macaroni
Dragonar Academy as Primrose Shelly
If Her Flag Breaks as Hakua Berserker Bladefield
JoJo's Bizarre Adventure: Stardust Crusaders as Female Student E (episode 2), Tourist B (episode 5)
Log Horizon 2 as Mikakage
Magi: The Kingdom of Magic as Sana
Rail Wars! as Miho Nanao
Selector Infected Wixoss as Rūko Kominato
Selector Spread Wixoss as Rūko Kominato
Terraformars as Erika Nakanojō, Announcer (episode 1)
Witch Craft Works as Maid (episode 2)
Your Lie in April as Girl (episode 2), Store Clerk (episode 3)

2015
Aikatsu! as Noel Otoshiro and Leona Stroop
Bikini Warriors as Mage
Food Wars: Shokugeki no Soma as Mayumi Kurase
High School DxD BorN as Rossweisse
Knights of Sidonia: Battle for Planet Nine as Chimera Controller
Maria the Virgin Witch as Anne
Mikagura School Suite as Asuhi Imizu
Mobile Suit Gundam: Iron-Blooded Orphans as Almiria Bauduin
Monster Musume as Lala
Rokka: Braves of the Six Flowers as Chamo Rosso
The Asterisk War as Julis-Alexia van Riessfel
Utawarerumono: The False Faces as Rurutie

2016
Brave Witches as Hikari Karibuchi
D.Gray-man Hallow as Lenalee Lee
God Eater as Iroha Utsugi
Naruto Shippuden as Chino
The Asterisk War 2nd Season as Julis-Alexia van Riessfel
The Lost Village as Lovepon, Boy

2017
18if as Airi Kojima
A Sister's All You Need as Miyako Shirakawa
Children of the Whales as Neri, Aíma
Clockwork Planet as RyuZU
Hand Shakers as Mayumi Akutagawa
Knight's & Magic as Nora Frykberg
Konohana Kitan as Sakura
Magical Circle Guru Guru as Iruku (episode 3, 9)
NTR: Netsuzou Trap as Yuma Okazaki
Seven Mortal Sins as Sloth Demon Lord Belphegor (episodes 1–2, 5–6, 9–12)

2018
A Certain Magical Index III as Misaka Worst
Amanchu! Advance as Misaki Kotori
As Miss Beelzebub Likes as Sargatanas
Conception as Aafii
High School DxD Hero as Rossweisse
Kakuriyo: Bed and Breakfast for Spirits as Oryō
Last Period as Erika
Lostorage Conflated WIXOSS as Rūko Kominato
Märchen Mädchen as Agathe Arier
Yuuna and the Haunted Hot Springs as Nonko Arahabaki

2019
Demon Slayer: Kimetsu no Yaiba as Makomo
To the Abandoned Sacred Beasts as Nancy Schaal Bancroft
Arifureta: From Commonplace to World's Strongest as Aiko Hatayama
Val × Love as Itsuyo Saotome
Azur Lane as Unicorn, Takao
Aikatsu on Parade! as Noel Otoshiro

2020
Bofuri as May
Healin' Good PreCure as Rabirin
Fruits Basket 2nd Season as Machi Kuraki
Super HxEros as Kirara Hoshino
The Misfit of Demon King Academy as Menou Historia
King's Raid: Successors of the Will as Frey

2021
Mushoku Tensei: Jobless Reincarnation as Eris Boreas Greyrat
That Time I Got Reincarnated as a Slime as Albis
Sonny Boy as Aki
Restaurant to Another World 2 as Myra
Bakugan: Geogan Rising as Crystal Blue

2022
Chimimo as Hazuki Onigami
Utawarerumono: Mask of Truth as Rurutie
Reincarnated as a Sword as Fran
Arknights: Prelude to Dawn as Franka

2023
Bofuri 2nd Season as May
Kubo Won't Let Me Be Invisible as Hazuki Kudō
Reborn to Master the Blade: From Hero-King to Extraordinary Squire as Rafinha Bilford
The Magical Revolution of the Reincarnated Princess and the Genius Young Lady as Ilia Coral
Soaring Sky! Pretty Cure as Mashiro Nijigaoka/Cure Prism
Ippon Again! as Natsu Umehara
I Got a Cheat Skill in Another World and Became Unrivaled in the Real World, Too as Luna
Ao no Orchestra as Ritsuko Akine
My Love Story with Yamada-kun at Lv999 as Runa Sasaki

2024
Whisper Me a Love Song as Kaori Tachibana

Original video animation (OVA)
12sai. (2014), Hanabi Ayase

Original net animation (ONA)
Momokuri (2015–16), Yuki Kurihara
The King of Fighters: Destiny (2017), Yuri Sakazaki
7 Seeds (2019), Kurumi Shikano
Gundam Build Divers Re:Rise (2019), Freddie
Aikatsu on Parade! (2020), Noel Otoshiro

Theatrical animation
Majocco Shimai no Yoyo to Nene (2013), Nene
Selector Destructed WIXOSS (2016), Rūko Kominato
Fairy Tail: Dragon Cry (2017), Riana
Batman Ninja (2018), Catwoman
Pompo: The Cinéphile (2021), Mystia

Video games
BlazBlue: Continuum Shift Extend (2011), Operator
Ciel Nosurge (2012), Ion (Ionasal kkll Preciel)
Hakuisei Renai Shoukougun RE:Therapy (Claris)
Tottemo E Mahjong (2013), Shizu Tsubakino
Tokyo 7th Sisters (2014), Rona Tsunomori
Ar Nosurge (2014), Ion (Ionasal kkll Preciel)
Kadenz fermata//Akkord：fortissimo (2014), Camellia
The Witcher 3: Wild Hunt (2015), Cerys An Craite
Criminal Girls 2: Party Favors (2015), Kuroe
Tokyo Xanadu (2015), Sora Ikushima
Cytus Omega (2015), MIU
I Am Setsuna (2016), Setsuna
Uppers (2016), Karen Takebayashi
The King of Fighters XIV (2016), Yuri Sakazaki
Valkyrie Anatomia: The Origin (2016), Norn
Dream Girlfriend (2016)
Girls' Frontline (2016), Type 100, VSK-94
Granblue Fantasy (2016), La Coiffe
Blue Reflection (2017), Sarasa Morikawa
Azur Lane (2017), HMS Unicorn, HMS Exeter & IJN Takao
Magia Record: Puella Magi Madoka Magica Side Story (2017), Kanoko Yayoi and Melissa de Vignolles
Alice Gear Aegis (2018), Chieri Kondō
The King of Fighters All Star (2018), Yuri Sakazaki
SNK Heroines: Tag Team Frenzy (2018), Yuri Sakazaki
Dragalia Lost (2018), Lucretia
Fire Emblem: Three Houses (2019), Edelgard von Hresvelg
Arknights (2019), Frostleaf, Franka
Another Eden (2019), Tiramisu
Ash Arms (2019), BT-5, B-24 Liberator
Genshin Impact (2020), Rosaria
Fate/Grand Order (2021), Assassin (Kiichi Hōgen)
SINoALICE (2021), Catwoman
The King of Fighters XV (2022), Yuri Sakazaki
AI: The Somnium Files – Nirvana Initiative (2022), Tama
Counter:Side (2022), Naielle Bluesteel
Goddess of Victory: Nikke (2022), Ludmilla, Laplace
The 13th Month (2022), The Corpse Princess
Da Capo 5 (2023), Mizuha Sakuragi
Blue Archive (2023), Sakurako Utazumi
404 Game Re:set (2023), Out Run

Appearances in other media

Drama CD
Kaden Tantei wa Shizuka ni Warau (2012), Magical Rori Kosei Mirun-chan
Last Game (2016), Momoka Tachibana

Radio
Anime Tantei-dan 3

Narration
Arc System Works Family Series PV

Vocaloid
Voice provider for Rana

Dubbing

Batman Ninja, Catwoman

References

External links
 Mausu Promotion agency profile 
 

Living people
1988 births
Voice actresses from Fukuoka Prefecture
Vocaloid voice providers
Japanese voice actresses
Japanese video game actresses
21st-century Japanese actresses
Mausu Promotion voice actors